Raul Zucchetti (born 28 January 1998) is an Italian footballer who plays for Serie D club Arconatese.

Club career
He made his Serie C debut for AlbinoLeffe on 17 September 2017 in a game against Santarcangelo.

On 22 August 2018, he was signed by Imolese on a temporary deal.

On 30 August 2019, he joined Gozzano.

References

External links
 

1998 births
People from Rho, Lombardy
Living people
Italian footballers
Association football defenders
A.C. Milan players
Virtus Entella players
U.C. AlbinoLeffe players
A.C. Prato players
A.C. Gozzano players
Imolese Calcio 1919 players
Serie C players
Serie D players
Footballers from Lombardy
Sportspeople from the Metropolitan City of Milan